AFU may refer to:

Language
 Afu, the native name of the Eloyi language, a language spoken in Nigeria
 Efutu language (ISO 639-3 code: AFU), a Guang language spoken in coastal Ghana

Organizations and companies
 Armed Forces of Ukraine, the military forces of Ukraine 
 Abingdon Film Unit, an English animated film association
 Advanced Flying Unit, a British Royal Air Force squadron code
 AFU Goodfriends, an associated music act of Even Steven Levee
 Agriculture and Forestry University, a public agricultural university in Nepal
 Aktiengesellschaft für Flugzeugunternehmungen, a Swiss aircraft manufacturer
 Al Falah University, Dubai, United Arab Emirates
 Al-Falah University, Haryana, India
 All for Unity, a political and electoral alliance in Scotland
 Archives for UFO Research, a Swedish depository of materials and works about ufology
 Association Footballers' Union, a labour union of football players in England from 1898–1901
 Athletic Federation of Uzbekistan, maintains Uzbekistani records in athletics

People
 Afu Agbaria (born 1949), Israeli Arab politician
 Afu-Ra (born 1974), American underground rapper
 Paki Afu (born 1990), New Zealand rugby league player
 A-fu (born 1987), Taiwanese singer

Other
 "A.F.U. (Naturally Wired)", a song on the 1988 Van Halen album OU812
 Afrinat International Airlines (ICAO code: AFU), a West African airline active from 2002–2004
 Aspergillus fumigatus non-coding RNAs, as an abbreviation
 Accelerator Functional Unit, a term for a hardware execution unit

See also
 A Fu, Chinese clay figurines
 Afus, Iran
 Afuw ("Forgiving"), one of the 99 names for Allah (God) in Islam
 AF (disambiguation)